Kings Beach is a coastal suburb of Caloundra in the Sunshine Coast Region, Queensland, Australia, located directly east of Caloundra CBD.

Geography 
The suburb faces the Coral Sea from its north-east to its south, with a sandy beach to the south and south-east and a rocky headland to the north and north-east.

The suburb has medium density housing, both permanently occupied and for holiday accommodation. The commercial development is mostly along the beach front where there are also amenities for beach visitors (showers and toilets). There is parkland along the beach front and a walking path around the headland.

History 
Kings Beach was named after the King family, the first European residents in the area. After living at Moffat Head in James Moffat's home for a while, they moved to the Kings Beach area in 1893.

St Andrew's Anglican Church was dedicated on Sunday 22 January 1939 by Archbishop William Wand. The construction of the church had been strongly encouraged by Wand who holidayed at Caloundra with his friend Queensland Governor Leslie Wilson. The Governor also attended the church's dedication. On 10 December 1966 the foundation stone of the new church was laid Archbishop Philip Strong, who opened and dedicated the new church on 8 December 1967. The new church was consecrated in 1974.

Within Kings Beach's boundaries is Wickham Head, a headland off which the hospital ship AHS Centaur is believed to have been sunk by Japanese submarines in 1943.

Heritage listings
Kings Beach has a number of heritage-listed sites, including:
 6 Arthur Street and 3 Canberra Terrace: Caloundra Lighthouses
 Ormonde Terrace: Kings Beach Bathing Pavilion

Education 
There are no schools in Kings Beach, but there are primary and secondary schools in neighbouring Caloundra.

Amenities 
St Andrew's Anglican Church is at 46 Upper Gay Terrace, Kings Beach.

References

External links

 

Suburbs of the Sunshine Coast Region
Caloundra
Beaches of Queensland